TeCA may refer to:

 1,1,2,2-Tetrachloroethane
 Tetracyclic antidepressant